István Jutasi (22 December 1929 – 24 December 2011) was a Hungarian sailor. He competed in the Star event at the 1960 Summer Olympics.

References

External links
 

1929 births
2011 deaths
Hungarian male sailors (sport)
Olympic sailors of Hungary
Sailors at the 1960 Summer Olympics – Star
People from Barcs
Sportspeople from Somogy County